San Antonio del Estrecho is a town in northern Peru, capital of Putumayo Province in Loreto Region. 
According to the 2014 census, it had a population of 8,000  people.
It is served by the El Estrecho Airport.

References

Populated places in the Loreto Region